Idee or Idée may refer to:

People 
Émile Idée (born 1920), French professional road bicycle racer

Other 
Idée, Inc., creator of image search engine TinEye
Idée fixe (psychology), a fixation
Idée Fixe (album), 1978 album by Aerolit
Idée reçue, a received or accepted idea
"Idee Stupide", 2006 single released by Fabri Fibra
Les idées de ma maison (disambiguation)

See also
Idea
Ide (disambiguation)
Ides (disambiguation)
Ideen (disambiguation)
Idée fixe (disambiguation)